Nahuel Ezequiel Tecilla (born 16 January 1995) is an Argentine professional footballer who plays as a centre-back for Tristán Suárez, on loan from Belgrano.

Career
Tecilla started his senior footballing career in Primera D with El Porvenir, he scored four goals in fifty-nine appearances for the club. 2016 saw Tecilla join Argentine Primera División side Lanús. A year later, in July 2017, Tecilla was loaned out to Primera B Metropolitana's Atlanta. He made his professional debut on 4 September 2017 during a goalless draw with Colegiales, however the match was later awarded as a Atlanta win following Colegiales fielding an ineligible player. In the reverse fixture later that season, Tecilla scored his first professional goal versus Colegiales in a draw on 27 January. They were promoted to tier two in 2018–19.

On 7 August 2019, Tecilla returned to Atlanta on a two-year contract.

Career statistics
.

References

External links

1995 births
Living people
Footballers from Buenos Aires
Argentine footballers
Association football defenders
Primera D Metropolitana players
Argentine Primera División players
Primera B Metropolitana players
El Porvenir footballers
Club Atlético Lanús footballers
Club Atlético Atlanta footballers
Club Atlético Belgrano footballers
CSyD Tristán Suárez footballers